A referendum on the "double yes" for referendums was held in Liechtenstein on 13 September 1987. The proposal would mean that during referendums on draft legislation, voters would have the option of rejecting all proposals (an initiative, counter-initiative and a proposal by the Landtag), agreeing with one proposal, or agreeing to several. If voters were to agree with several, they had to rank them in case more than one was approved by voters. It was approved by 62.9% of voters.

Results

References

1987 referendums
1987 in Liechtenstein
Referendums in Liechtenstein
September 1987 events in Europe